Explosive: the best of Bond is a compilation album by the crossover classical string quartet Bond. As well as the audio CD, the album also contains a DVD which has three music videos, a photo gallery, their complete discography, and all the tracks on Dolby Digital 5.1 Surround Sound or 48 kHz/16 bit PCM Stereo. The CD also contains three previously unreleased tracks. There is also a DualDisc edition of the album.

Official track list
"Victory" (Mike Batt mix) 3:25
"Explosive" 3:10
"Fuego" 2:59
"Viva!" 3:15
"Shine" (Dubshakra mix) 3:56
"Wintersun" 3:27
"Scorchio" 3:31
"Duel" 4:13
"Gypsy Rhapsody" 3:35
"Caravan" 3:44
"Sugarplum" 2:21
"Carmina" 4:20
iTunes bonus track
 "Innocent" 3:17

DVD
"Explosive" (Promo video)
"Fuego" (Promo video)
"Victory" (Promo video)
"Photo Gallery"
"Discography"
"Track listing in 5.1 Dolby Surround"

Bond (band) albums
2005 compilation albums
2005 video albums
Music video compilation albums
Decca Records compilation albums